Rocco Silano is an American magician, author, and lecturer.

Biography 
Silano was born c. 1960, in Paterson, New Jersey. Early on in his career, Rocco studied with and was managed by sleight-of-hand expert and Tony Slydini protégé Bill Wisch. Silano studied with Wisch for at least 4 months in 1980, when Wisch taught him many Slydini routines, including Slydini's cigarette production. “For the last four months Silano has taken private lessons from Bill Wisch, the successor to Slydini, the famous 83-year-old magician, Slydini, who is “one of the best” according to Silano, does not teach anymore. One of the routines Silano has learned from Wisch is Slydini's cigarette production routine known as “poetry in magic” according to Silano." Later, Rocco was introduced to Slydini by Bill and Rocco took lessons with Slydini as well. Rocco stated in an interview with the Wise Guyz Radio Show on May 1, 2019, "He (Bill Wisch) hooked me up with Tony Slydini. He was a student before I was with Slydini and he introduced me to him."  In 1988, he invented a gable-top milk carton that could be more easily collapsed for disposal by removing a tear strip at the bottom of the carton.

Most known for his sleeving techniques and skill, Silano is the recipient of the Merlin and Golden Lion Awards, a two-time winner of the coveted Manhattan Association of Cabarets Award, and has been nominated nine times as Magician of the Year by the Academy of Magical Arts in four different categories.

Silano is the only American to win awards at two FISM World Tournaments: 3rd place in Micromagic in 1994  in Yokohama, Japan, and "Most Original Act" in 2006 in Stockholm, Sweden.  Silano performed at the 2007 Austrian Magic Convention in Vienna, Austria, and appeared in the VH1 celebrity magic reality series, Celebracadabra, in 2008, as an adviser and guide for celebrity partner and 1st runner-up, Hal Sparks.

Bibliography 
The Winning Edge: The Lecture of a Champion, with Bill Wisch, 1987
If it fits...Sleeve it!, with Steve Schneiderman, 1990 ASIN B000NO7YZ2
A Lesson in Sleeving

References

External links 
Rocco Interview with MagicNewswire.com

Further reading
 Demaline, Jackie. (October 14, 1988) Times Union Abracadabra - It's Magic. Page C1.
 Burgess, Linda H. (February 22, 1989) The Record From soup to sleight of hand. Magician helps meals take off. Page C3.
 The Times-Picayune (April 27, 1990) Here tomorrow, gone today. Page L4.
 Yu, Winifred. (October 30, 1990) Times Union Colored doves are a magical illusion. Page C8.
 Kelly, Martin P. (November 2, 1990) Times Union Magicians create enchanted evening. Page C5.
 Mervis, Scott. (October 8, 1993) Pittsburgh Post-Gazette Festival of Italian arts. Page 3.
 Carney, Beth; Dezell, Maureen. (September 19, 1998) The Boston Globe Game of choice for Kearns Goodwin. Page C2.
 Times Union (October 28, 2007) My other life. Page D1.
 McMaster, Shawn. (March 2008) The Magazine for Magicians Celebracadabra: VH1's Magic Reality Series.

1962 births
American magicians
American performance artists
American autobiographers
Living people
Writers from Paterson, New Jersey
Sleight of hand